In mathematics, especially in the field of category theory, the concept of injective object is a generalization of the concept of injective module. This concept is important in cohomology, in homotopy theory and in the theory of model categories. The dual notion is that of a projective object.

Definition

That is, every morphism  factors through every monomorphism .

In Abelian categories
The notion of injectivity was first formulated for abelian categories, and this is still one of its primary areas of application.

If  is an exact sequence in  such that Q is injective, then the sequence splits.

Enough injectives and injective hulls

If g is an essential monomorphism with domain X and an injective codomain G, then G is called an injective hull of X.  The injective hull is then uniquely determined by X up to a non-canonical isomorphism.

Examples
In the category of abelian groups and group homomorphisms, Ab, an injective object is necessarily a divisible group. Assuming the axiom of choice, the notions are equivalent.
In the category of (left) modules and module homomorphisms, R-Mod, an injective object is an injective module. R-Mod has injective hulls (as a consequence, R-Mod has enough injectives).
In the category of metric spaces, Met, an injective object is an injective metric space, and the injective hull of a metric space is its tight span.
In the category of T0 spaces and continuous mappings, an injective object is always a Scott topology on a continuous lattice, and therefore it is always sober and locally compact.

Uses
If an abelian category has enough injectives, we can form injective resolutions, i.e. for a given object X we can form a long exact sequence

and one can then define the derived functors of a given functor F by applying F to this sequence and computing the homology of the resulting (not necessarily exact) sequence. This approach is used to define Ext, and Tor functors and also the various cohomology theories in group theory, algebraic topology and algebraic geometry. The categories being used are typically functor categories or categories of sheaves of OX modules over some ringed space (X, OX) or, more generally, any Grothendieck category.

Generalization 

If  is the class of monomorphisms, we are back to the injective objects that were treated above.

If g is a -essential morphism with domain X and an -injective codomain G, then G is called an -injective hull of X.

Examples of -injective objects

In the category of simplicial sets, the injective objects with respect to the class  of anodyne extensions are Kan complexes.
In the category of partially ordered sets and monotone maps, the complete lattices form the injective objects for the class  of order-embeddings, and the Dedekind–MacNeille completion of a partially ordered set is its -injective hull.

See also
Projective object

Notes

References
Jiri Adamek, Horst Herrlich, George Strecker. Abstract and concrete categories: The joy of cats, Chapter 9, Injective Objects and Essential Embeddings, Republished in Reprints and Applications of Categories, No. 17 (2006) pp. 1-507, Wiley (1990).
J. Rosicky, Injectivity and accessible categories
F. Cagliari and S. Montovani, T0-reflection and injective hulls of fibre spaces

Category theory

de:Injektiver Modul#Injektive Moduln